Jürgen Heuser (born 13 March 1953 in Barth, Mecklenburg-Vorpommern) is a German weightlifter.

In 1978, participating for the German Democratic Republic, he won the World Championship in Gettysburg, Pennsylvania. At the 1980 Summer Olympics in Moscow he won a silver medal in the +110 kg class.

References

External links

1953 births
Living people
People from Barth, Germany
German male weightlifters
Olympic weightlifters of East Germany
Olympic silver medalists for East Germany
Weightlifters at the 1980 Summer Olympics
Olympic medalists in weightlifting
Medalists at the 1980 Summer Olympics
Sportspeople from Mecklenburg-Western Pomerania